Red Island may refer to:
Red Island, Newfoundland and Labrador
Red Island, Queensland
Red Island (Antarctica)
Red Island (Grenadines), in St Vincent and the Grenadines
Red Island Holiday Camp, in Ireland
Rhode Island, meaning red island
Rote Insel, neighborhood of Berlin
Red Island (Salton Sea), a volcano in Southern California
Red Island Minerals, a company based in Madagascar
Madagascar is often called "the red island" for its red soils

See also
Isola Rossa